Cathal mac Ruaidri Ó Conchobair was a king of the Connachta of western Ireland.

The ascension date of Cathal as king of all the Connachta is uncertain, though F.X. Martin assigns it to 1426. He was one of the last of the kings, who were by now reduced to their ancestral lands in County Roscommon.  He died on 19 March 1439.

References

 Byrne, Francis John (2001), Irish Kings and High-Kings, Dublin: Four Courts Press, 
 Gaelic and Gaelised Ireland, Kenneth Nicols, 1972.

1439 deaths
People from County Roscommon
15th-century Irish monarchs
Infectious disease deaths in Ireland
Year of birth unknown